The Peso problem in finance is a problem which arises when "the possibility that some infrequent or unprecedented event may occur affects asset prices". The difficulty or impossibility of predicting such an event creates problems in modeling the economy and financial markets by using the past.

It is useful in various contexts, in particular, in analyzing the Forward premium anomaly.

History 
The precise origin of the term is unknown, but it is generally attributed to Milton Friedman. Mexico in the 1970s, had pegged the Mexican peso to the US Dollar, a peg which had held for more than 20 years. Friedman noted the large gap between the interest rate on Mexican bank deposits and the interest rate on comparable US bank deposits.  Friedman reasoned that interest differential reflected concern in the market that the peso would be devalued. This was eventually realized in 1976 when the peso, allowed to float, fell 46 percent.

Since the currency value had been pegged for a long time, the differential in interest rate looked like an anomaly or flaw in financial markets - an investor could exploit the difference by simple currency conversion and make a profit. The anomaly could be explained once the possibility of a large drop in the value of the peso is admitted.

The empirical work first discussing this was by Kenneth Rogoff in 1977 which was part of his Ph.D. dissertation. The first treatment in academic literature was by Krasker in 1980.

References

See also
Economic puzzle
Real exchange-rate puzzles
Equity premium puzzle

International finance
International macroeconomics
Economic puzzles